ArtBridge is a public art non-profit organization that was founded in 2009. Working primarily in New York City, ArtBridge’s mission is to support local, emerging artists and their communities through large-scale public installations.

History 

ArtBridge was founded in 2008 by artist Rodney Durso as a mechanism to transform New York City’s construction fencing into large-scale, outdoor art exhibitions. New York City is immersed in nearly 300 miles of construction fencing, which provides for an ideal canvas to promote the city’s local, emerging artists. The non-profit was incorporated in 2012 and received its 501(c)(3) status in 2014. ArtBridge has produced exhibitions in every borough of New York City, as well ongoing projects in L’Aquila, Italy in the years of construction following the city’s devastating 2009 earthquake.

Exhibitions 

ArtBridge uses scaffolding and sidewalk fencing as exhibition space, reproducing artworks on weather-resistant vinyl. The non-profit has recently expanded into doing asphalt murals and 'step street' murals. ArtBridge’s first exhibition was held in 2009 at the London Terrace Gardens, when it was undergoing construction. Since then, the organization has installed many exhibitions throughout the city. From July 2011 to September 2014, ArtBridge hosted eight exhibitions in its former Chelsea gallery, The Drawing Room.

References

External links

Instagram
Twitter

2009 establishments in New York City
2012 establishments in New York City
Charities based in New York City
Arts organizations based in New York City
Organizations established in 2009